Oberea pseudobalineae is a species of beetle in the family Cerambycidae. It was described by Stephan von Breuning in 1955.

References

Beetles described in 1955
pseudobalineae